Rzeczpospolita is a Polish word for "republic" or "commonwealth" and may refer to:

Current or historical Polish states
 Polish–Lithuanian Commonwealth (1569–1795)
 Rzeczpospolita Polska, current official name of the Republic of Poland

Press
 Rzeczpospolita (newspaper), published since 1920 (with hiatuses)
 Rzeczpospolita Polska (magazine), published 1941–1945

See also
 Name of Poland